Validity or Valid may refer to:

Science/mathematics/statistics:

 Validity (logic), a property of a logical argument
 Scientific:
 Internal validity, the validity of causal inferences within scientific studies, usually based on experiments
 External validity, the validity of generalized causal inferences in scientific studies, usually based on experiments
 Valid name (zoology), in animal taxonomy
 Validly published name, in plant taxonomy
 Validity (statistics), the application of the principles of statistics to arrive at valid conclusions 
 Statistical conclusion validity, establishes the existence and strength of the co-variation between the cause and effect variables
 Test validity, validity in educational and psychological testing
 Face validity, the property of a test intended to measure something 
 Construct validity, refers to whether a scale measures or correlates with the theorized psychological construct it measures
 Content validity, the extent to which a measure represents all facets of a given construct
 Concurrent validity, the extent to which a test correlates with another measure
 Predictive validity, the extent to which a score on a scale or test predicts scores on some other measure
 Discriminant validity, the degree to which results a test of one concept can be expected to differ from tests of other concepts that should not be correlated with this one
 Criterion validity,  the extent to which a measure is related to an outcome
 Convergent validity, the degree to which multiple measures of the same construct lead to the same conclusion

Other:

 Valid (number format), a universal number format (unum type III) 
 Valid (engraving company), a Brazilian company
 VALID (Video Audio Line-up & IDentification), part of the GLITS broadcast television protocol
Validity and liceity (Catholic Church), concepts in the Catholic Church.

See also

Validation (disambiguation)